The 1962 St. Louis Cardinals season was the team's 81st season in St. Louis, Missouri and its 71st season in the National League. The Cardinals went 84–78 during the season and finished 6th in the NL, 17½ games behind the San Francisco Giants. Also in 1962, the Cardinals became the first NL club to wear names on the backs of their uniforms that season.

Offseason 
 October 10, 1961: 1961 Major League Baseball expansion draft
Bob Lillis was drafted from the Cardinals by the Houston Colt .45's.
Don Taussig was drafted from the Cardinals by the Houston Colt .45's.
 October 13, 1961: Al Cicotte was purchased from the Cardinals by the Houston Colt .45's.
 October 24, 1961: Red Schoendienst was released by the Cardinals.
 November 21, 1961: Elrod Hendricks was signed as a free agent by the Cardinals.
 November 27, 1961: Joe Cunningham was traded by the Cardinals to the Chicago White Sox for Minnie Miñoso.
 November 27, 1961: John Anderson was drafted by the Cardinals from the Baltimore Orioles in the 1961 rule 5 draft.
 Prior to 1962 season: Duke Carmel was acquired by the Cardinals from the Los Angeles Dodgers.
 March 1962: Duke Carmel was purchased from the Cardinals by the Cleveland Indians.

Regular season 
Pitcher Bobby Shantz and first baseman Bill White won Gold Gloves this year.

Season standings

Record vs. opponents

Opening Day lineup

Notable transactions 
 May 7, 1962: John Anderson and Carl Warwick were traded by the Cardinals to the Houston Colt .45s for Bobby Shantz.
 June 5, 1962: Alex Grammas and Don Landrum were traded by the Cardinals to the Chicago Cubs for Bob Smith and Daryl Robertson.

Roster

Player stats

Batting

Starters by position 
Note: Pos = Position; G = Games played; AB = At bats; H = Hits; Avg. = Batting average; HR = Home runs; RBI = Runs batted in

Other batters 
Note: G = Games played; AB = At bats; H = Hits; Avg. = Batting average; HR = Home runs; RBI = Runs batted in

Pitching

Starting pitchers 
Note: G = Games pitched; IP = Innings pitched; W = Wins; L = Losses; ERA = Earned run average; SO = Strikeouts

Other pitchers 
Note: G = Games pitched; IP = Innings pitched; W = Wins; L = Losses; ERA = Earned run average; SO = Strikeouts

Relief pitchers 
Note: G = Games pitched; W = Wins; L = Losses; SV = Saves; ERA = Earned run average; SO = Strikeouts

Farm system 

LEAGUE CHAMPIONS: Atlanta, Tulsa, Billings

References

External links
1962 St. Louis Cardinals at Baseball Reference
1962 St. Louis Cardinals team page at www.baseball-almanac.com

 

St. Louis Cardinals seasons
Saint Louis Cardinals season
St Louis